The 2013–14 season is Accrington Stanley's eighth consecutive season in the Football League and League Two.

Fixtures & Results

Pre-season friendlies

League Two

FA Cup

League Cup

League Trophy

League Two Data

League table

Result summary

Squad

Statistics

|}

Captains

Goalscorers

Contracts

Transfers

In

Loans In

Out

Loans In

References 

2013-14
2013–14 Football League Two by team